Christopher Urswick (1448–1522) was a priest and confessor of Margaret Beaufort. He was Rector of Puttenham, Hertfordshire, and later Dean of Windsor. Urswick is thought to have acted as a go-between in the plotting to place her son Henry VII of England on the throne.

Early life and education
Urswick was born at Furness in 1448.  His father, John Urswick, and his mother were lay brother and sister of Furness Abbey.

He was educated at Lancaster Royal Grammar School (which was then called 'The Free School at Lancaster')

Career
He was Archdeacon of Wilts (1488–1522), Archdeacon of Richmond (1494–1500) and Archdeacon of Norfolk (1500–1522). Circa 1486 he was given the prebend of Chiswick in St Paul's Cathedral. He was also Dean of York from 1488 to 1494, a Canon of St George's Chapel, Windsor from 1492 to 1496 and then Dean of Windsor from 1495 to 1505. He was the Lord Almoner from 1485 to 1495.

He declined the position of Bishop of Norwich in 1498 and was collated Archdeacon of Oxford in 1504.

Amongst his more important positions, Urswick became Rector of the Parish of Hackney in 1502, where he ordered the medieval parish church to be rebuilt. St Augustine's Tower is the only remnant.

Death
Urswick died on 24 March 1522 in Hackney (parish) and was buried in St Augustine's Church, Hackney.

Commemoration 
He appears as a minor character in Shakespeare's Richard III.

He built a parish house in Hackney (Urswick House, now demolished), where he lived for a time. He is commemorated in Urswick Road in nearby Homerton. 

He founded The Urswick School for 12 poor boys, and was until recently called Hackney Free and Parochial School in Hackney Central. The Urswick Chantry in St. George's Chapel commemorates him.

References

Further reading

1440s births
1522 deaths
16th-century English Roman Catholic priests
16th-century English clergy
15th-century English people
Archdeacons of Richmond
Archdeacons of Norfolk
Archdeacons of Wilts
Archdeacons of Oxford
Canons of Windsor
Deans of Windsor
Deans of York